Michael Roe (born 8 August 1955) is a former racing driver from Naas, Ireland.

Roe began racing in Formula Ford and won the 1978 Formula Ford Festival. The following year he drove in British Formula Three and finished in 9th place in his rookie campaign with 2 podium finishes for David Clark's team. In 1983 he moved to the United States to compete in the single-seat Can-Am series where he finished 8th in the championship. In 1984 Roe won 7 of the 10 rounds of the series on his way to dominating the championship, setting a series record for wins in a season as well as poles in a season (all 10 rounds). The following year Roe competed in CART Championship Car racing and made four starts for Hemelgarn Racing with a best finish of 7th at Portland followed up by an 8th-place finish later that month at Meadowlands Racetrack. His two point-scoring finishes placed him 27th in the championship. He also attempted to qualify his Hemelgarn Lola-Cosworth for the Indianapolis 500, but he was bumped from the field.

Racing record

PPG Indycar Series
(key) (Races in bold indicate pole position)

24 Hours of Le Mans results

References

1955 births
Living people
British Formula Three Championship drivers
Champ Car drivers
Formula Ford drivers
Irish racing drivers
People from Naas
Sportspeople from County Kildare
World Sportscar Championship drivers
24 Hours of Le Mans drivers

Ecurie Ecosse drivers